Freddy André Øvstegård  (born 20 December 1994) is a Norwegian politician. 
He was elected representative to the Storting for the period 2017–2021 for the Socialist Left Party. He serves in the Storting Standing Committee on Family and Culture, as well as the Standing Committee on Scrutiny and Constitutional Affairs.

References

1994 births
Living people
Socialist Left Party (Norway) politicians
Members of the Storting
Østfold politicians